Drežnik may refer to:

 Drežnik, Serbia, a village near Užice
 Drežnik, Črnomelj, a village in Slovenia
 Drežnik, Kostel, a village in Slovenia
 Drežnik Viaduct, a viaduct in Karlovac, Croatia
 , a village near Rešetari, Croatia
 Drežnik Grad, a village in Croatia
 Drežnik Brezovički, a village near Zagreb, Croatia
 Drežnik Podokićki, a village near Samobor, Croatia